Azamat Vyacheslavovich Zaseyev (born 29 June 1988) is a Russian professional football player. He plays for Alania Vladikavkaz.

Club career
He advanced with FC Ufa from the third-tier PFL to Russian Premier League, where he made his debut on 3 August 2014 in a game against FC Kuban Krasnodar.

Career statistics

Club

Notes

External links
 
 

1988 births
Sportspeople from Vladikavkaz
Living people
Russian footballers
Association football defenders
Association football midfielders
FC Spartak Vladikavkaz players
PFC Krylia Sovetov Samara players
FC Ufa players
Russian Premier League players
Russian First League players
Russian Second League players